Antonio "Chivas" Martínez (born 9 July 1977) is a Mexican former professional footballer who last played as a midfielder for Major League Soccer club Chivas USA.

Nicknamed "Chivas" for his devotion to Chivas de Guadalajara, Martínez played college football at Cal State Fullerton and was drafted by the then-Dallas Burn in the second round of the 2000 MLS SuperDraft. Martínez played three and a half seasons for Dallas, leading the team in assists in 2002, setting a club record for assists in a game, with three.

Martinez was traded to the Los Angeles Galaxy, scoring a goal in his debut game. Martinez spent the first half 2004 with Spain's Salamanca where he became the first Mexican to play for the club in its eighty-five year history. Joined Mexico's Necaxa for the Torneo de Invierno 2004 season. Martínez came back to MLS in 2005, his rights were traded from Galaxy to Chivas USA, a team he seemed destined to play for. Martinez finished the year second in the team for scoring. He has scored 10 goals and 26 assists in five years of MLS league play. Martínez was released by Chivas prior to the 2006 season.

Statistics

References

1977 births
Living people
American sportspeople of Mexican descent
Mexican footballers
Cal State Fullerton Titans men's soccer players
FC Dallas players
LA Galaxy players
Chivas USA players
People from Yahualica, Jalisco
La Liga players
UD Salamanca players
Mexican emigrants to the United States
Major League Soccer players
Club Necaxa footballers
MLS Pro-40 players
A-League (1995–2004) players
FC Dallas draft picks
Association football midfielders